Lady in White is a 1988 American independent supernatural mystery film directed, produced, written and scored by Frank LaLoggia, and starring Lukas Haas, Len Cariou, Alex Rocco and Katherine Helmond. The plot follows a schoolboy in 1962 upstate New York who becomes embroiled in the mystery surrounding a series of child murders after he witnesses the ghost of a young girl who was murdered in his school's coat closet.

Much of filming took place in Lyons, New York, which took advantage of the appropriate local lore and scenery. The story is based on a version of The Lady in White legend, concerning a woman who supposedly searches for her daughter in Durand-Eastman Park in Rochester, New York, from where the director hails.

Despite positive reviews from critics, the film was a box office bomb. It later earned status as a cult film.

Plot
On Halloween 1962, nine-year-old Frankie Scarlatti is locked inside his classroom coatroom by schoolmates Donald and Louie at the end of the day. Trapped well after dark, he witnesses the apparition of a young girl being murdered in the coatroom, though her assailant is invisible. Moments later, a man enters the coatroom and attempts to open a vent grate on the floor, but notices Frankie. He strangles him to unconsciousness. In a near-death vision, Frankie again sees the girl, who asks for his help to find her mother. Frankie is revived by his father, Angelo, and rushed to the hospital. Frankie was unable to see his attacker's face. The school janitor, Harold "Willy" Williams, found drunk in his office, is arrested as he was on school grounds at the time of the assault.

As Frankie recovers at home, his brother, Geno, shows him a newspaper article about the attack. He learns it is linked to eleven killings, all apparently by a serial killer targeting children. The ghostly girl is Melissa Ann Montgomery, and she continues to appear to Frankie. They form a tenuous friendship. Striving to help Melissa, Frankie returns to the coatroom and removes the cover of the net to discover several dust-laden objects, including toys, a hair clip, and a high school class ring. Later, he overhears the chief of police telling Angelo that the case against the janitor is crumbling and that the coatroom is also the scene of Melissa's murder. After considering this new information, Frankie confides in Phil, a family friend, that the class ring likely belongs to the killer and that he thinks the killer returned to the coatroom to retrieve it as the school's heating system was being replaced. Unbeknownst to Frankie, the ring, which had accidentally fallen out of his pocket earlier, was found by Geno and hidden away again.

Later, Donald and Louie lure Frankie out to the nearby cliffs, where they encounter a ghostly lady dressed in white. All three boys take off running and Frankie collides into Geno in the surrounding woods. Frankie tries to explain the link between Melissa, the attacker and the lady in white, but is unsuccessful. One evening, Melissa appears to both Geno and Frankie. The town clock begins to chime and Frankie realizes that her nightly death re-enactment is about to commence. They follow her ghost to the school then wait until her lifeless body reappears, which is carried by an invisible figure from the school and onto the cliffs. At the last minute, Melissa awakes and begins screaming as she is thrown over the cliffs. A pale, blond woman dressed in white then comes out of the cottage. Upon seeing Melissa's lifeless body on the rocks below, she flings herself off the cliff and also plunges to her death. The ghostly scene ends and the brothers head home. Finally, Frankie understands the source of Melissa's anguish. He vows to help her bring her killer to justice.

A grand jury fails to indict Willy due to insufficient evidence. Outside the courthouse, the distraught mother of one of the murdered children shoots and kills him. Researching the class ring, Geno examines one of Angelo's old yearbooks and realizes that he and the killer wore the same type of class rings. The yearbook reveals that the initials on the ring, "MPT", belong to Michael P. Terragrossa. Geno quickly deduces that the "P" stands for Phillip—as in their family friend Phil—and he rushes to tell his father. Frankie happens to be with Phil at that same time, and realizes Phil is the killer after he begins whistling "Did You Ever See a Dream Walking?", Melissa's song. Phil realizes that Frankie has deduced his secret and attacks him, but Frankie escapes and runs to the cliffs. Phil catches him and confesses to the murders just before he starts to strangle Frankie again. Suddenly, Phil is struck from behind and they both collapse to the ground.

Regaining consciousness, Frankie finds himself in Melissa's old cottage with Amanda Harper, and learns that she was the one who saved him from Phil, and that she was the lady in white Frankie saw earlier when he was with Donald and Louie. Amanda reveals that she is Melissa's aunt and has been living in the cottage since the deaths of her sister and niece. Without warning, Phil attacks and kills Amanda, setting the building ablaze in the process. Pulling Frankie from the burning cottage, Phil attempts to throw him over the cliff. However, Frankie drops safely to the ground when the ghostly lady in white suddenly appears and frightens Phil, causing him to tumble over the cliff's edge. Melissa emerges from the burning cottage and the two ghosts happily reunite, ascending into the sky in a cascade of light. As Frankie crawls away from the ledge, Phil grabs his ankle. Angelo, Geno, and the police arrive and save Frankie. Angelo also tries to save Phil, but overcome with shame, Phil lets go and falls to his death. Everyone watches the cottage burn to the ground as the snow begins to fall.

Cast

Production
LaLoggia partly based the screenplay of the film on The Lady in White legend, regarding a woman who supposedly searches for her lost daughter in Durand-Eastman Park in Rochester, New York, LaLoggia's hometown.

Financing

The film was entirely financed ($4.7 million) through a penny stock offering. New Sky Communications, a public company set-up by Frank LaLoggia and his cousin Charles M. LaLoggia, traded initially on NASDAQ for 10 cents a share. It was the first and only occasion that a single, feature film was financed in this manner.

“'Charlie came to me and said ‘Look, we may be able to do this again (raise money independently) if we go public.’ He said that there was a possibility we could structure a penny stock offering to raise the money to make another film,” Frank told HalloweenLove. “It took us quite a while to structure this public entity called New Sky Communications. We had a number of brokers around the country selling stock for "Lady" and it took us about three years, from beginning to end, to bring Lady in White to fruition.'”

While Charles led the fundraising effort on the East Coast, Frank did the same in Los Angeles. There, he secured commitments from Lukas Haas (Witness), Tony Award winner Len Cariou, and his friend Katherine Helmond, best known as Mona on Who’s the Boss, one of America’s 10 most-watched TV shows at the time. In fact, Helmond pitched in a little of her own money to the fund-raising.
Across all of their fundraising efforts, Frank and Charles raised $4.7 million, and they endeavored to use the money wisely – meticulously storyboarding every scene prior to the 15-week production, forgoing a standard practice like a completion bond insuring against budget overages...
The cousins managed to recoup every penny of their negative costs before the film had even hit theaters. They sold the foreign rights to Samuel Goldwyn Productions for a $1,000,000 advance and 70% of all foreign sales bringing their foreign earnings to over 2.7 million.  Home video rights went to Richard Branson’s Virgin Vision for $2,000,000, and New Century Vista picked up U.S. theatrical while guaranteeing a $1,000,000 spend to open the picture.

Reception and legacy
The film had a budget of $4.7 million and only grossed around $1.7 million at the United States box office.(This figure pertains to the U.S. theatrical gross ticket sales only. The film recouped its entire production budget of $4.7 million via foreign, video and cable tv earnings and further earned an estimated $3 to $5 million, net, in subsequent years.)

Critical reception
The film has had a mostly positive critical response focusing on the stylish small-town vibe and suspense without gore.  Writing in the Chicago Sun-Times, Roger Ebert stated: "Lady in White, like most good films, depends more on style and tone than it does on story, and  it's the whole insidious atmosphere of the film that begins to envelop us...We have been this way before in countless other movies, but not often with so much style, atmosphere and believable human nature.." New York Times critic Caryn James praised the film stating that : "Here are the bones of an ordinary ghost story. But the writer and director Frank LaLoggia brings them to life with exceptional vitality...The extended Scarlatti family -warm, funny, so real they make the characters in Moonstruck seem like impostors...Mr. LaLoggia creates an unusual, effective child's-eye-view of a sinister wide world, a restless afterlife, and the comforts of family." Newsweek'''s David Ansen wrote: "'Lady in White' is uncommonly ambitious and daringly eclectic...who needs big stars and $20 million special effects when you've got a good yarn to spin and a storyteller who trusts his tale? Gather round the campfire and enjoy." Pauline Kael wrote, in The New Yorker: "'Lady in White' is a ghost movie with an overcomplicated plot but it has a poetic feeling that makes up for much of the clutter...and there are touches that charm you: the piles of candy corn in the window of the Kandy Kitchen; the pack of dogs that chase after bicyclists but are turned back by a nun's basilisk glare...and there's endearing, giggly tom foolery between Frankie and his older brother (Jason Presson). Laloggia puts on a good show." Peter Travers for People Magazine wrote: "This one is going to scare you senseless. Bone chilling and unexpectedly moving  "Wonderful and potent... an enthralling movie experience," said The Hollywood Reporter. Variety wrote "Lady in White is a superb supernatural horror film from independent filmmaker Frank LaLoggia...This probably is as good a nightmare as any impressionable boy could have and still be suspenseful enough to get most adults’ hearts going." Lady in White'' maintains a 69% "Fresh" rating on Rotten Tomatoes from 16 reviews  and a 70% rating on Metacritic.

Awards and nominations
Lukas Haas and Katherine Helmond were both nominated for a Saturn Award in 1990, Haas was also nominated for and won a Young Artist Award. The film itself received nominations for a Young Artist Award and a Fantasporto. The film was selected as "an outstanding film of the year for presentation" at the London Film Festival in 1988 and won Best Film and the Audience Award at The Festival of Imagination in Clermont-Ferrand, France in 1988.

Home media
The film was first introduced to the home video market on VHS by Virgin Vision and later by Anchor Bay on October 15, 1993. It was also released on laserdisc and DVD through Elite Entertainment, who released a Director's Cut with an extended 4 minutes on March 25, 1998. The director's cut was reissued on DVD by Metro-Goldwyn-Mayer on September 20, 2005, and featured bonus materials including 36 minutes of deleted footage and commentary from director Frank LaLoggia. In 2016, Scream Factory issued a Blu-ray edition of the film featuring the original 113-minute theatrical cut, the previously-released director's cut, and a never-before-seen extended director's cut running 127 minutes.

See also
 List of ghost films
 Urban legends
 Bing Crosby-who sang the version of "Did You Ever See a Dream Walking?" as heard on the film

References

External links
 
 
 
 

1988 films
1988 horror films
1980s ghost films
1980s mystery films
American ghost films
American mystery films
American serial killer films
American supernatural horror films
Films about bullying
Films set in 1962
Films set in New York (state)
Films set in the 1960s
Films shot in New York (state)
Halloween horror films
Period horror films
1980s English-language films
1980s American films